Judgment Day is a 1935 novel by James T. Farrell. It is the third and longest installment of  Farrell's trilogy based on the short, unhappy life of William "Studs" Lonigan.

Plot

This novel begins in 1931, a few years after the conclusion of The Young Manhood of Studs Lonigan,. At the close of that novel, an intoxicated Studs had been beaten up by old rival Weary Reilly, and left on a snow-covered sidewalk overnight. Studs contracted pneumonia that night and has been in ill-health ever since. Several of Studs' old friends have already died, due to venereal diseases or excessive drinking, and Weary Reilly himself is in prison for rape. Studs is beginning to sense his own weakness and his own mortality, and continually makes vain promises to change his ways.

Studs' young brother Martin, now known as "Husk," is very much like Studs himself was a decade earlier. He's a drinker and brawler who openly disrespects Studs, and even inflicts a severe beating on his older brother.

Studs begins dating a sweet, innocent Catholic woman named Catherine Banahan. He seems to love her and even asks her to marry him, but remains obsessed by sexual thoughts, and looks constantly for chances to cheat on her. Studs is incapable of being true to her, but feels strong guilt about his lust and infidelity.

The Great Depression is wreaking havoc on Chicago. Studs' father's painting business is failing and the family home may soon be repossessed by the bank. Studs' father hopes that Studs can provide the family with some financial support, not knowing that Studs has foolishly lost most of his savings after investing in a worthless stock, in yet another vain attempt at getting rich and becoming a big shot.

Studs gets Catherine pregnant, and must desperately seek a job. After job hunting all over the city on a rainy day, Studs contracts pneumonia again, and dies after falling into a feverish coma.

Themes

Judgment Day is the most overtly political of the Studs Lonigan novels, Earlier installments of the trilogy seemed to blame most of Studs' failures on a combination of Irish Catholic culture and Studs' own foolishness. Judgment Day concentrates more on the devastation and suffering caused by the Great Depression, and reflects Trotskyite author James T. Farrell's belief that capitalism itself is responsible for the travails of families like the Lonigans. The novel also demonstrates Farrell's frustration with working class Irishmen. To Farrell, it seems obvious that a socialist revolution is called for. But blue collar Irish-Americans like the Lonigans denounce socialists as "Reds,"  foolishly blame the Jews for their plight, and openly yearn for an American equivalent of Benito Mussolini to come to power.

References 

1935 American novels
Vanguard Press books